In stock market trading, a bull trap is an inaccurate signal that shows a decreasing trend in a stock or index has reversed and is now heading upwards, when in fact, the security will continue to decline.

It is seen as a trap because the bullish investor purchases the stock, thinking it will increase in value, but is trapped with a poor performing stock whose value is still falling.

See also 

Economic bubble
Stock market bubble
Speculation
Boom and bust
Market trend
Dead cat bounce

References 
 Setting the Bull Trap (investorinsight.com)
 Don’t Fight a Bull Trap (stocks-simplified.com)

Behavioral finance
Business cycle
Stock market
Financial crises